Connecticut's 73rd House of Representatives district elects one member of the Connecticut House of Representatives. It encompasses parts of Waterbury and has been represented by Democrat Ronald Napoli Jr. since 2019.

List of representatives

Recent elections

2020

2018

2016

2014

2012

References

73